James Roy may refer to:
 James A. Roy (born 1964), US Chief Master Sergeant of the Air Force
 James Roy (politician) (1893–1971), New Zealand politician of the National Party
 James Roy (writer) (born 1968), Australian writer